The Lads of Wamphray is Child ballad 184, existing in fragmentary form. According to Walter Scott and others, the ballad concerns a 16th-century feud between reiving families from Wamphray in the Scottish Borders.

Synopsis

The ballad opens with a description of the robberies of the Galiard and Galiard's men before the text breaks off.

When the ballad resumes, the Galiard has taken a horse, but it proves not fast enough; he is captured, and his captors hang him.  His nephew sees, raises men, and avenges his death.  They return home safely.

Adaptations
Percy Grainger took inspiration from this for his 1905 work The Lads Of Wamphray March, his first composition for wind band.

See also
List of the Child Ballads

Sources
Walter Scott, Minstrelsy of the Scottish border (1802)
C L Johnstone, The Historical Families of Dunfriesshire and the Border Wars (1878)

External links
The Lads of Wamphray

Child Ballads
Scottish outlaws
Border ballads
Year of song unknown